Eyesaw is a UK-based street artist best known for subverting advertisement posters found in London bus shelters, often using simple silhouettes with amusing anecdotes.

Early life
There is not much information regarding eyesaw's private life or real identity.
Eyesaw traces his graffiti career back to his primary school days. "When I was about 7 years old, another kid and I were bored at lunch time. We did not want to play outside in the rain with the other kids, so we entered our classroom unattended and found the poster paints. We then emptied them onto the floor and painted the whole floor with our feet. As you could imagine, it was very slippery, so naturally we slipped and fell. Later, we were both caught because we were covered head to toe in paint. We were later punished by the headmaster. To this day, I feel the injustice; we were only expressing ourselves. This might have been the start of my disregard for authority and my love of graffiti."

Work 
In 2008  nine artists including Eyesaw, were commissioned to paint a high-profile graffiti mural in the Royal Albert Hall depicting the building's 138-year history,  and displaying images of some of the  most notable figures to have graced its stage, including Jimi Hendrix, Eric Clapton, Muhammad Ali and  Luciano Pavarotti.

His work to date comprises subverting advertisement posters found in London bus shelters, often using simple silhouettes with amusing anecdotes.
 "I aim to make the viewer question their surroundings and the world we live in and their role in society. By placing my work in prime advertising space the passer-by is almost fooled into believing my work is an advert selling more shit they don’t need. As my work offers no explanation as to what is being sold, the viewer is made to ask their own questions and draw their own conclusions. As a result I gain great satisfaction knowing I have removed a crap advert from circulation and replaced it with one of my works and just maybe open someone’s eyes to society’s downfalls".

References

External links 
 

British graffiti artists
Living people
Year of birth missing (living people)